Irene Lailin Sáez Conde (born 13 December 1961 in Chacao, Miranda, Venezuela) is a Venezuelan politician and beauty queen who was crowned Miss Universe 1981. She has been a model, was the mayor of Chacao (a municipality of Caracas), Governor of the state of Nueva Esparta and a former presidential candidate.

Early life and education
Irene Lailin Sáez Conde, was born and spent her childhood in Chacao, Miranda, (Venezuela). Her father, Carlos Sáez and her mother, Ligia Conde, who died when Irene was three years old.

Career

1981–1989: Pageant wins and early political roles 
Early in her career, Sáez was named the Queen of Club Campestre Los Cortijos for three years in a row. Sáez was crowned Miss Venezuela 1981 and later, crowned Miss Universe 1981 at the 30th annual pageant in New York City at the age of 19. After spending a year traveling the world as Miss Universe, Sáez had studied political science at the Central University of Venezuela, and then served successfully a year as Venezuela's cultural representative to the United Nations expanding the international contacts developed into the realm of culture and diplomacy.

1990–1997: Mayor of Chacao
In the early 1990s, Sáez turned to electoral politics and a week after the November 1992 coup attempt, led by Hugo Chávez, she was elected mayor of Chacao Municipality, in Caracas. Unbeknownst to Sáez at the time, her political future would continue to be tied to Chávez's rise in the country. In office as mayor of Chacao Municipality, Sáez tackled Chacao's high crime rate by professionalising the municipal police force, with university graduates as officers, higher pay, new police vehicles, and a variety of mobility devices (including roller skates and mountain bikes) allowing the police to move around quicker. Crime fell dramatically as a result of her innovative ideas. Without political experience or an established party machine, Sáez was content to delegate on experts, and "hired top-notch administrators and listened to their advice about everything from setting the budget to running public services."

In December 1995, Sáez was reelected as mayor of Chacao with 96% of the vote, the highest share of the vote in Venezuela's democratic history. The Times of London ranked her 83rd in its list of the 100 most powerful women in the world..

In 1997, she was awarded the Distinguished Achievement Award at the Miss Universe Pageant, a recently created prize of the Miss Universe Organization. She made her acceptance speech in both English and Spanish. Sáez was received in the International Airport Simón Bolívar by former president of Venezuela, Luis Herrera Campins and he gave her a chain of gold for her victory in Miss Universe.

1998: Presidential campaign

Sáez kept her distance from mainstream parties for as long as she could, and in 1997 formed the Integrated Representation of New Hope (IRENE) Party as a launch pad for her eventual run in the December 1998 presidential elections. In the final poll of the year in December 1997 she reached almost 70% support – just one year prior to the presidential elections.

However, despite spending millions of dollars on publicity, Sáez fell below 15% within six months, as the public became increasingly skeptical of her readiness for the presidency and she lost credibility as an anti-establishment candidate after accepting the endorsement of COPEI, an invitation analysts now see as a political trap for a candidate ahead of her times.

Sáez won the internal COPEI primary election with 62.7% of the vote, against Eduardo Fernandez's 35.7%, at an extraordinary convention with 1,555 COPEI delegates taking place at a Caracas hotel, an endorsement earned after COPEI realized their original male candidate was unable to win. Its leaders ascertained their best bet to remain competitive nationally was replace him with the charismatic yet independent Irene Sáez, transforming her into the first independent and female candidate supported by a major political party for the presidency of Venezuela.

Sáez was credited with bringing to national politics the voice of a vast majority of Venezuelans disenchanted with politics as usual, wrapped in the familiar sophistication of a global beauty queen with ties to the elite class. Because of her physical attractiveness and ability to speak, public newspapers like El Nacional described her television appearances as "Reaganesque". To make herself more politically familiar, Sáez adopted Argentina's Eva Perón's hair style and fiery language of social revolution. Her strong speech preceded Hugo Chávez's as she was a presidential candidate for years before him. Sáez ran on a platform of ending corruption, reducing bureaucracy and refinancing public debt. Her campaign slogan was "a revolution is possible".

Ultimately, COPEI's former president, Rafael Caldera, pardoned Chávez for the attempted coup against Pérez, from the opposing Democratic Action party, making possible his eventual ascendance to power.

Ultimately she finished a distant third with 2.82% of the vote.

1999–2000: Governor of Nueva Esparta and boards
Soon after the 1998 presidential election, Sáez was elected Governor of the state of Nueva Esparta, in an election made necessary by the January 1999 death in office of Rafael Tovar. She won overwhelmingly with more than 70% of the votes, defeating the candidate of Democratic Action. She served as governor of the state until 2000, stepping down when she became pregnant, denying rumors that she was pushed aside by Chávez. Since 2003, Sáez lives currently in Miami where she was named to the board of directors of the Colonial BancGroup, south Florida region.

See also

List of Governors of States of Venezuela
List of Miss Universe titleholders
List of Miss Universe runners-up and finalists
List of Miss Venezuela contestants
List of Miss Venezuela titleholders
List of Venezuelans
List of Venezuelan Americans

References

External links
Analysis of the political career of Irene Sáez.
Sáez as Governor (Margarita Island) – BusinessWeek Online, Oct. 18, 1999 issue 

Video
YouTube: Final Miss Venezuela 1981
YouTube: Miss Universe 1981 Coronation

1961 births
Central University of Venezuela alumni
Governors of Nueva Esparta
Living people
Mayors of places in Venezuela
Miss Universe 1981 contestants
Miss Universe winners
Miss Venezuela winners
People from Caracas
Venezuelan beauty pageant winners
Women mayors of places in Venezuela
20th-century Venezuelan women politicians
20th-century Venezuelan politicians
Universidad Metropolitana alumni
Women state governors of Venezuela
Beauty queen-politicians